José Rafael González (born November 23, 1964) is a retired professional baseball player who played eight seasons for the Los Angeles Dodgers, Pittsburgh Pirates, Cleveland Indians, and California Angels of Major League Baseball.

References

External links

1964 births
Living people
Albany-Colonie Diamond Dogs players
Albuquerque Dukes players
Bakersfield Dodgers players
California Angels players
Cleveland Indians players
Dominican Republic expatriate baseball players in Canada
Dominican Republic expatriate baseball players in the United States
Edmonton Trappers players
Lethbridge Dodgers players
Lodi Dodgers players
Long Island Ducks players
Los Angeles Dodgers players
Major League Baseball outfielders
Major League Baseball players from the Dominican Republic
Pittsburgh Pirates players
Rio Grande Valley White Wings players
San Antonio Dodgers players
Scranton/Wilkes-Barre Red Barons players